New Buffalo station is a train station in New Buffalo, Michigan, served by Amtrak, the United States' passenger railroad system.

History

From August 5, 1984 to October 26, 2009, Amtrak's Pere Marquette (Chicago—Grand Rapids) stopped in New Buffalo at a station along the old C&O alignment. This station was located approximately seven blocks south of the current station, close to the New Buffalo Railroad Museum. When the current station opened along the Michigan Line, the Pere Marquette stopped serving New Buffalo, although the trains still pass through town along this alignment.

References

External links

 New Buffalo Amtrak Station (USA Rail Guide -- Train Web)
 New Buffalo Railroad Museum

Amtrak stations in Michigan
Buildings and structures in Berrien County, Michigan
Transportation in Berrien County, Michigan
Railway stations in the United States opened in 2009
New Buffalo, Michigan
Michigan Line
2009 establishments in Michigan